4th Medical Battalion is a unit of the United States Marine Corps, staffed by personnel from both the United States Marine Corps and the United States Navy that provides medical support to United States Marine Corps forces. The unit is based out of San Diego, California and falls under the command of the 4th Marine Logistics Group and the Marine Forces Reserve.

Mission
To provide direct and general Health Service Support (HSS) to Marine Forces Reserve in order to sustain the combat effort. Secondary mission is to provide security for the Shock Trauma Platoons (STP) and Forward Resuscitative Surgical Systems (FRSS).

Subordinate units
 Headquarters and Services Company – San Diego, CA
 Headquarters and Services Company, Detachment 3 - Fort Worth, TX
 Surgical Company Alpha – North Versailles, PA
 Surgical Company Alpha, Detachment 1 - Knoxville, TN
 Surgical Company Alpha, Detachment 2- Cincinnati, OH
 Surgical Company Alpha, Detachment 5 - New York, NY
 Surgical Company Bravo – Washington, DC
 Surgical Company Bravo, Detachment 4 - Fort Dix, NJ
 Surgical Company Bravo, Detachment 6 - Orlando, FL

History
4th Medical Battalion was deployed as a whole in 2003 in support of operation Iraqi Freedom. Upon arrival to Kuwait the forces supported the mission. Since then the unit has been actively deployed in support of operations in Iraq.
In 2006 reservists from San Diego H&S Detachment mobilized for combat operations in the Anbar Province of Al Fallujah, Iraq with 1st Battalion-24th Marines, Weapons Company. Also in September 2007, reservists from 4th Medical Battalion deployed in support of Operation Iraqi Freedom as part of Combat Logistics Battalion 4, Combat Logistics Battalion 8, Surgical Company Bravo, Al Taqqadum Surgical, Camp Fallujah and Al Taqqadum|Camp Taqaddum. These members returned in late March and demobilized while more reservists from the battalion deployed to replace those stationed at TQ and Korean Village.

As of May 2010, many of the reservists from H&S Company have volunteered for duty in Afghanistan, with Provisional MP Company and PSD. Regardless of rank and MOS, reservists at 4th medical Battalion continue to move forward and volunteer for deployment.

References

External links
 Medical Battalion's official website

4th Marine Logistics Group
Med 4